

Crown
Head of State - Queen Elizabeth II

Federal government
Governor General - Edward Schreyer

Cabinet
Prime Minister -  Pierre Trudeau
Deputy Prime Minister - Allan MacEachen
Minister of Finance - Allan MacEachen
Secretary of State for External Affairs - Mark MacGuigan
Secretary of State for Canada - Francis Fox then Gerald Regan
Minister of National Defence - Gilles Lamontagne
Minister of National Health and Welfare - Monique Bégin
Minister of Regional Economic Expansion - Pierre De Bané
Minister of the Environment - John Roberts
Minister of Justice - Jean Chrétien
Minister of Transport - Jean-Luc Pépin
Minister of Communications - Francis Fox
Minister of Fisheries and Oceans - Roméo LeBlanc
Minister of Agriculture - Eugene Whelan
Minister of Public Works - Paul James Cosgrove
Minister of Employment and Immigration - Lloyd Axworthy
Minister of Indian Affairs and Northern Development - John Munro
Minister of Energy, Mines and Resources - John Roberts

Parliament
See: 32nd Canadian parliament

Party leaders
Liberal Party of Canada - Pierre Trudeau
New Democratic Party- Ed Broadbent
Progressive Conservative Party - Joe Clark

Supreme Court Justices
Chief Justice: Bora Laskin
William McIntyre
Ronald Martland
Antonio Lamer
Roland Almon Ritchie
John Sopinka
Jean Beetz
Julien Chouinard
Gerald Eric Le Dain

Other
Speaker of the House of Commons - Jeanne Sauvé
Governor of the Bank of Canada - Gerald Bouey
Chief of the Defence Staff - Air General R.M. Withers

Provinces

Premiers
Premier of Alberta - Peter Lougheed
Premier of British Columbia - Bill Bennett
Premier of Manitoba - Sterling Lyon then Howard Pawley
Premier of New Brunswick - Richard Hatfield
Premier of Newfoundland - Brian Peckford
Premier of Nova Scotia - John Buchanan
Premier of Ontario - Bill Davis
Premier of Prince Edward Island - Angus MacLean then James Lee
Premier of Quebec - René Lévesque
Premier of Saskatchewan - Allan Blakeney

Lieutenant-governors
Lieutenant-Governor of Alberta - Frank C. Lynch-Staunton
Lieutenant-Governor of British Columbia - Henry Pybus Bell-Irving
Lieutenant-Governor of Manitoba - Francis Lawrence Jobin then Pearl McGonigal
Lieutenant-Governor of New Brunswick - Hédard Joseph Robichaud then George F.G. Stanley
Lieutenant-Governor of Newfoundland and Labrador - Gordon Arnaud Winter then William Anthony Paddon
Lieutenant-Governor of Nova Scotia - John Elvin Shaffner
Lieutenant-Governor of Ontario - John Black Aird
Lieutenant-Governor of Prince Edward Island - Joseph Aubin Doiron
Lieutenant-Governor of Quebec - Jean-Pierre Côté
Lieutenant-Governor of Saskatchewan - Irwin McIntosh

Mayors
Toronto - Art Eggleton
Montreal - Jean Drapeau
Vancouver - Michael Harcourt
Ottawa - Marion Dewar

Religious leaders
Roman Catholic Bishop of Quebec - Cardinal Archbishop Louis-Albert Vachon
Roman Catholic Bishop of Montreal -  Cardinal Archbishop Paul Grégoire
Roman Catholic Bishops of London - Bishop John Michael Sherlock
Moderator of the United Church of Canada - Lois M. Wilson

See also

1980 Canadian incumbents
Events in Canada in 1981
1982 Canadian incumbents
 Governmental leaders in 1981
 Canadian incumbents by year

1981
Incumbents
Canadian leaders